List of University of Florida basketball players may refer to:

List of Florida Gators in the NBA
List of Florida Gators in the WNBA

Lists of basketball players in the United States
Florida Gators basketball